John Spencer (born Arthur John Spencer; 18 August 1954 in Wigan, Lancashire) was an English cricketer. He was a left-handed batsman and right-arm medium-fast swing bowler who played for Wiltshire.

Spencer made a single List A appearance for the team, during the 1984 season, having made a single Second XI appearance for Gloucestershire v Northants while still studying at St Paul's P.E College in Cheltenham, ten seasons previously. 
Spencer did not bat in the match, and bowled 12 overs, taking figures of 4-82, claiming the prized wickets of David Gower and Peter Wiley in the process.

External links
John Spencer at Cricket Archive

1954 births
Living people
Cricketers from Wigan
English cricketers
Wiltshire cricketers